Ronnie Nyakale, is a South African actor, MC and entrepreneur. He is best known for the roles in the films; Blood Diamond (2006), Machine Gun Preacher (2011) and Gangster's Paradise: Jerusalema (2008) and "Cosmo Diale" on Generations: The Legacy (2016 - current)

Personal life
Nyakale was born in Soweto, South Africa. He is married to Lebogang Mashilo. The couple has one daughter.

Career
In 1999, he made film debut with a short film titled Portrait of a Young Man Drowning. In the same year, he acted in the SABC1 television drama series Yizo yizo with the role "gangster Papa Action", where he later won the Best Supporting Actor Award in Drama Series category at the NTVA Avanti Awards. After that success, he joined with e.tv soap opera Rhythm City and played the role of gangster, "Ding Dong". In 2006, he acted in the series A Place Called Home by playing the critic acclaimed role "Sylvester". For that role, he was nominated for the Best Actor Award in TV Drama category at the 2010 South African Film and Television Awards (SAFTA). In 2006, he acted in the Hollywood blockbuster Blood Diamond. In the meantime, he joined with the television mini series Fallen in 2007. For that mini series, he won the Best Supporting Actor Award in TV Drama category at the 2012 SAFTA.

In 2008, he acted in the film Gangster's Paradise: Jerusalema and played the role "Zakes Mbolelo". In 2011, he played the lead role "AJ" in the film Machine Gun. The film received critics acclaim as well. Then he made a supportive role "Captain Stone" in the film Avenged, which was previously known as iNumber Number. In 2013, he starred in the Mzansi Magic miniseries Naledi with the role "Pheto". Then In 2017, he joined with the cast of first season of Generations the Legacy and played the role of "Cosmo Diale".

Filmography

References

External links
 IMDb

Living people
South African male film actors
South African male television actors
South African male stage actors
Year of birth missing (living people)